Nicholson is a coastal locality in the Shire of Burke, Queensland, Australia.

Geography
The waters of the Gulf of Carpentaria form most of the north-eastern boundary. The Nicholson River enters from the south-west and then forms parts of the southern boundary before re-entering the locality to discharge into the Gulf.

National Highway 1 runs along part of the southern boundary before turning north-west to run through the locality.

History

Hells Gate
Hells Gate Roadhouse (founded 1986) is a tourist stop on the Savannah Way, 80 km from Doomadgee and 50 km from the Northern Territory border, and on the Cliffdale Station cattle property. The name refers to a pass in the nearby escarpment.

The Hells Gate airstrip has one runway of length .

Heritage listings 
Nicholson has a number of heritage-listed sites, including:
 Old Westmoreland Homestead

Indigenous languages 
Yukulta (also known as Ganggalida) is an Australian Aboriginal language. The Yukulta language region is the Gulf Country including the local government areas of the Aboriginal Shire of Doomadgee and Shire of Mornington.

Yulluna (also known as Yalarnga, Yalarrnga, Jalanga, Jalannga, Wonganja, Gunggalida, Jokula) is an Australian Aboriginal language. The Yulluna language region includes the  local government boundaries of the Shire of Cloncurry and other areas near the Gulf of Carpentaria.

References

External links
 Hells Gate Roadhouse

Shire of Burke
Coastline of Queensland
Localities in Queensland